Alexandros Soutsos (1803–1863) was a Greek poet from a prominent Phanariote family. He founded the Greek Romantic school of poetry. Soutsos was born in Istanbul in 1803 from Chian parentage. At the time of the Greek Revolution, he was a young, liberal partisan. He wrote poems to encourage the insurgents. Soutsos studied in Chios, where he spent his formative years. Later he moved to Paris, where he was influenced by the liberal philosophies of the French intellectuals. His major work of prose was the Exóristos (The Exile). His works were instrumental in developing liberal thought in the young Greek monarchy. He was an admirer of Lord Byron. Whose inspiration prompted Soutsos to try to emulate him. The resultant work, was his longest poem Periplanómenos (The Wanderer), in spite of some positive reviews, it never achieved international success. In spite of his lack of artistic respect, he was admired by many of his contemporaries the Greek people admired him for his dedication to freedom, and for his liberal philosophies. He died in Athens in 1863, and his works were published in 1916.

Evangelis Zappas explicitly requested that Alexandros Soutsos and his brother Panagiotis Soutsos be made members of the organizing committee of the Olympic Games. It was Panagiotis Soutsos who first made mention of a revival of the Olympic Games in his poetry Dialogue of the Dead in 1833.

References

1803 births
1863 deaths
Modern Greek poets
First Athenian School
Romantic poets
Alexandros
Writers from Istanbul
19th-century Greek poets
Constantinopolitan Greeks